Vladimir Korotkov may refer to:

 Vladimir Korotkov (footballer, born 1941), Soviet Russian football player and coach 
 Vladimir Korotkov (tennis) (born 1948), Soviet tennis player who won boys' singles at the Wimbledon twice and French Open once and later represented USSR in the Davis Cup
 Vladimir Korotkov (sailor), Ukrainian yacht racer who won several competitions in the Soling class